The PCM High School is a rural public high school in Monroe, Iowa, United States. It is a part of the PCM Community School District, and made up of two consolidated schools from Prairie City and Monroe, serving the communities of Otley and Reasnor as well. It is a 2A school district in the heart of Iowa.

History

Sports
In 1991, the Monroe Wildcats and the Prairie City Plainsmen consolidated to form the PCM Mustangs.

In basketball, the boys' team won the last state 2A state championship played in Veterans Memorial Auditorium (2004) before it was moved to Wells Fargo Arena.

In 2008, the high school boys' golf team won sectionals, districts, and the 2A golf state championship, with a total of 658 over the Gilbert Tigers with a team score of 659.

In 2018, PCM the football team went undefeated (13-0) and made their first UNI-Dome appearance since the 2006 season. They finished with a 28–7 win over Boyden-Hull/ Rock Valley to win the first ever football state championship.

Notable ALumni
Brandon Myers, professional football player, who now plays for the Tampa Bay Buccaneers

See also
List of high schools in Iowa

References

 PCM High School official website

1992 establishments in Iowa
Educational institutions established in 1992
Education in Jasper County, Iowa
Public high schools in Iowa